Michael Huke (born March 30, 1969, in Sondershausen) is a retired German sprinter who specialized in the 100 and 200 metres. He represented the sports club TV 01 Wattenscheid.

At the 1993 World Championships he finished sixth in the 4x100 metres relay, together with teammates Marc Blume, Robert Kurnicki and Steffen Görmer.

His personal best times were 10.29 seconds in the 100 metres, achieved in June 1996 in Köln, and 20.60 seconds in the 200 metres, achieved in July 1994 in Erfurt.

References

External links

1969 births
Living people
People from Sondershausen
German male sprinters
Athletes (track and field) at the 1996 Summer Olympics
Olympic athletes of Germany
Sportspeople from Thuringia
20th-century German people